Soomevere may refer to several places in Estonia:

Soomevere, Jõgeva County, village in Jõgeva Parish, Jõgeva County
Soomevere, Viljandi County, village in Kõo Parish, Viljandi County